Dating Alone is a South Korean reality variety show that was broadcast from February 1, 2015, to April 18, 2015, where male guests participated in virtual dates with female celebrities who acted as virtual lovers. The show is a spin-off of the 2012 television series, Imagination Love Battle.

Format
For every two episodes, a female celebrity is featured and acts as a virtual lover who the male participants in the show will go on a date with. The purpose of the show is to see if men know the minds of women, and to study how they act in each situation.

The participants, or 'players', each go behind a monitor, that allows them to choose actions or things to say for every scene in the video. Each action will earn the players different points, or even make them lose points. To make the scenes more realistic for the participants, though behind a screen in the studio, in certain scenes in the video such as eating, they are also given food, or during a running scene, they are on a treadmill.

The show has some elements of a typical dating sim such as scenes between the character, or the virtual lover of the show, and the player. Points also increase or decrease according to the player's actions throughout the game, or in this case, the show.

The show's fixed hosts participate in the date, but the show also invites male celebrities. Male celebrities have also been featured in the scenes, acting as the player's rival for the virtual girlfriend's affections.

On March 11, 2015, JTBC announced its first 'Virtual Boyfriend Special' featuring the actor Seo Kang-joon as the show's first virtual boyfriend. They also stated that Girls' Generation's Kwon Yuri who appeared as a virtual girlfriend in episodes 3 and 4 will be returning, but as a part of the panel.

Hosts
Kim Min-jong
Jun Hyun-moo
Sung Si-kyung
Jang Dong-min
Shin Won-ho

Episodes

References

External links
 Dating Alone official MBC website 

South Korean dating and relationship reality television series
2015 South Korean television series debuts
Korean-language television shows